Valerii Valeriiovych Lunchenko (born on 13 October 1982, Khust, Zakarpattia Oblast, Ukraine) is Ukrainian politician, who has served as a People's Deputy of Ukraine in the 7th and 8th convocations.

Education
 In 2003 — graduated from Drohobych State Pedagogical University after Ivan Franko where he got a diploma of a manager-marketer.
 In 2004 — graduated from Hungarian National Institute (Nyiredhaza, Hungary), specialty “Private Entrepreneurship”.
 In 2006 — graduated from Kharkiv National Auto-Road University, specialty «Automobiles and Automobile Industry», got a Degree of the Master-researcher with Honors.

Work Activity
 2007–2010 — Logistics specialist at a private enterprise.
 Since December 2010 — The Chief of administration of Khust City Executive Committee. Since July, 2009, - a chairman of Khust City Department of public organization «Front of Change», and in December, 2009, was elected a Chairperson of Khust city organization of political party «Front of Change».
 31 October 2010 — was elected a Deputy of Zakarpattia Regional Council  from party «Front of Change».
 During the parliamentary elections of 2012 he was elected a People’s Deputy of Ukraine of the VIIth elections from All Ukrainian Unity Fatherland, № 61 in the list. A member of Verkhovna Rada of Ukraine on the questions of agricultural policy and land matters.
 2 March 2014 – 15 September 2014 — a chairman of Zakarpattia Oblast State Administration. At the special elections to the Verkhovna Rada in 2014 was elected a People’s Deputy of Ukraine in the 8th convocation in accordance with the party list (№ 19 in the list) from People’s Front.
 A member of deputy faction of political party «People’s Front».
 Position — Secretary of the Verkhovna Rada of Ukraine Committee on Agrarian Policy and Land Relations.

In the 2019 Ukrainian parliamentary election Lunchenko was reelected as an independent candidate in constituency 71 (in Zakarpatia Oblast). He won this election with 49.14% of the votes. In parliament he joined the Dovira faction.

Lunchenko and three other Dovira faction members (Vasyl Petiovka, Robert Khorvat and Vladislav Poliak) developed the local Zakarpattia Oblast party Native Zakarpattia. This part won 12 of the 64 seats in the Zakarpattia Oblast Council during the 2020 Ukrainian local elections.

Family 
He is married and has two daughters.

References

External linkq
 
 Verkhovna Rada of Ukraine, official web portal

1982 births
Living people
People from Khust
Independent politicians of Batkivshchyna
Governors of Zakarpattia Oblast
Front for Change (Ukraine) politicians
Seventh convocation members of the Verkhovna Rada
Eighth convocation members of the Verkhovna Rada
Ninth convocation members of the Verkhovna Rada
People's Front (Ukraine) politicians